is a Japanese former Nippon Professional Baseball infielder/outfielder. 

His younger brother Kenji is also a professional baseball player.

References 

1964 births
Living people
Baseball people from Osaka Prefecture 
Japanese baseball players
Nippon Professional Baseball infielders
Nippon Professional Baseball outfielders
Seibu Lions players
Nippon Professional Baseball coaches
Japanese baseball coaches